Gunaah is a 2002 Indian Hindi-language thriller film directed by Amol Shetge, written by Mahesh Bhatt and starring Bipasha Basu, Dino Morea and Irrfan Khan in the lead roles. The film was released on 16 September 2002. Upon release, the film received mixed-to-positive reviews. However, it was a box office failure.

Plot

Tough cop Prabha Narayan (Bipasha Basu) is haunted by the demons of her past. Being an illegitimate daughter of a prostitute, she has had a very bad childhood and there once occurred an incident in her life when she was driven to the point of committing a murder. But today, now that she is a cop, she believes that she can clear her conscience by reforming a criminal.

Prabha's life is turned topsy-turvy with the entry of Aditya Srivastava (Dino Morea), who is a good person at heart but was forced to take the path of crime due to the wrongdoings of the police system. Incidents which included his father getting urinated on in the police station.

Prabha goes to Aditya's house to nab him, but gets distracted when she sees him bathing and looks away. Aditya slips from under her vigilant eyes and a hasty chase follows. Prabha stays close on the heels of fleeing Aditya. At one point when she is about to fall off the rooftop, Aditya stops running and extends his hand to save her. This act makes a great impact on Prabha.

Prabha decides to know Aditya's past and find out what prompted him to commit a crime in the first place. She decides to reform him but she gets ‘reformed’ herself and falls in love in the process. Eventually, Prabha and Aditya fall in love. This continues with them being passionate towards each other. Then, a problem arises when Aditya escapes from jail and starts killing people again with reasons. Prabha being a good officer kills him when he is about to kill Police Inspector Digvijay Pandey (Irrfan Khan). She gets gold medal for killing him, and keeps the medal in front of his old fireman helmet, saying she loved him and a part of him will always live inside her.

Cast
 Dino Morea - Aditya Kashyap  
 Bipasha Basu - Prabha Narayan
 Irrfan Khan - Police Inspector Digvijay Pandey
 Ashutosh Rana - Ex-Havaldar Madhusudan Gokhale "Uncle"
 Avtar Gill
 Vishwajeet Pradhan
 Yashpal Sharma - Parshuram Kashyap

Soundtrack
The soundtrack was composed by Sajid–Wajid and Anand Raj Anand. The soundtrack had 7 songs. The songs were very popular upon release.

References

External links 

 

2000s Hindi-language films
Indian thriller films
2002 films
Films scored by Anand Raj Anand
Films scored by Sajid–Wajid
Films directed by Amol Shetge